The E. J. Whitten Legends Game was an annual charity all-star Australian rules football match played in Australia. Retired star players were reunited, along with selected non-footballing celebrities, in a State of Origin interstate game between Victoria and a composite side known as the All-Stars. The game was contested annually from 1996 to 2019 and played under Superules. 

Originally a sporting contest attracting interest from spectators, in later years it became a form of sports entertainment. Despite increasing celebrity appearances, scripting and manipulated outcomes increasing efforts to entertain a television audience were met by dwindling crowds and public interest.

History 
E. J. "Ted" Whitten, a former Footscray Football Club player who died of prostate cancer in 1995, was regarded as one of the greatest-ever players of the game. He was also passionate about State of Origin football. With his enthusiasm and ability to keep in the media spotlight, Ted had kept State of Origin going for many years, and his emotional farewell at the Victoria vs South Australia game at the MCG in 1995 has persisted as an enduring symbol of not only State of Origin passion but Australian rules football in general. Shortly after his death, the concept was brought into question, and the last such game was played in 1999.

When he died, his son, Ted Whitten Jr., launched a foundation for research into prostate cancer, and the Legends Game raises money for the foundation. So far, almost a million dollars have been raised for the E. J. Whitten Foundation.

The first-ever Legends Match was played at the Western Oval, home of the Footscray/Western Bulldogs, EJ Whitten's club. Most of the games have been televised free-to-air in Victoria and South Australia. Due to popularity of the event, later games were moved to bigger venues. Since 2003, the game has been held at Docklands Stadium.

In 2007, the organisers included for the first time, female participants: Daisy Pearce and  Shannon McFerran of the Victorian Women's Football League. Since this time it has become one of few high-profile mixed-gender-friendly events.

In February 2016, it was announced that the Seven Network had secured the rights to televise this match for the next five years; in addition, the match was moved to the football-free weekend between the final round of the premiership season and the first week of the finals series.

In 2018, the match was played at Adelaide Oval. This was the first game played in Adelaide since 1999.

In 2019, the match was contested under the AFLX format – a high-scoring format played on a rugby-sized field – and was played at AAMI Park in Melbourne.

The match was not held in 2020–2022 due to the impacts of the COVID-19 pandemic.

Highlights 
The game itself is a tongue-in-cheek affair, with games often involving non-football-related celebrities such as the comedy duo Hamish & Andy, the comedian Russell Gilbert, and the fictional character Bryan "Strauchanie" Strauchan, played by Peter Helliar. The game is frequently manipulated by the players, timekeepers, and field umpires in order to make for an exciting conclusion. Because of this, the average winning margin is only 7 points, including 5 draws.

The series has featured many memorable highlights over the years, including Stauchanie's various antics, usually involving staging for a free kick; a 75-metre barrel from Jimmy Bartel that resulted in a 10-point super goal; Jonathan Brown kicking a difficult pocket goal after the siren due to the umpire "not hearing the siren"; Anthony Rocca turning back the clock with a massive torpedo goal from inside the centre square; Russell Gilbert changing his guernsey to the opposite team's late in the game to score a goal for the other team (which became a running gag); Derek Kickett kicking the ball over his head from the right forward pocket for an unlikely goal; and Craig Hutchison's so-called "greatest goal in AFL history" in 2011 that involved selling candy to a mooning Ryan Fitzgerald before kicking a banana goal from nearly 40 metres out, which has since garnered more than 1.8 million views on YouTube alone.

Match results 

Wins: All-Stars: 11, Victoria: 12, Draws: 1 (4 drawn at the final siren, of which 3 were decided by kick-offs)

Biggest Win: All-Stars by 24 points in 2015.

Highest Score: All-Stars and Victoria (275), both in 2019.

Lowest Score: All-Stars and Victoria (38), both in the drawn 2000 match.

Most Man of the Matches: John Platten 2 (All-Stars), Matthew Lloyd 2 (Victoria)

References

External links 
 
 

Cancer fundraisers
All-star games
Australian rules football games
Annual sporting events in Australia
Australian rules football competitions in Australia
Seven Sport